Knipolegus is a genus of birds, the black tyrants, in the tyrant flycatcher family Tyrannidae.

The genus was erected by the German zoologist Friedrich Boie in 1826 with the blue-billed black tyrant as the type species. The genus name combines the Ancient Greek knips meaning "insect" and legō meaning "to pick".

Species
The genus contains the following 12 species:

References

 
Bird genera
Taxonomy articles created by Polbot